The following highways are numbered 994:

United States

Canada
Saskatchewan Highway 994